The 1917 Army Cadets football team represented the United States Military Academy in the 1917 college football season. In their first and only season under head coach Geoffrey Keyes, the Cadets compiled a  record, shut out four of their eight opponents, and outscored all opponents by a combined total of 203 to 24. All eight games were played at home and the Cadets' sole loss came to Notre Dame by a  score. The Army–Navy Game was not played this season or the next.

Halfback Elmer Oliphant was a consensus first-team player on the All-America team and was later inducted into the College Football Hall of Fame.

Schedule

References

Army
Army Black Knights football seasons
Army Cadets football